Antennulariella is a genus of fungi in the family Antennulariellaceae. The genus was circumscribed in 1915 by Russian mycologist Nikolai Nikolaevich Woronichin, with Antennulariella fuliginosa assigned as the type species.

Species
 Antennulariella alpina 
 Antennulariella batistae 
 Antennulariella concinna 
 Antennulariella fuliginosa 
 Antennulariella lichenisata

References

Capnodiales
Dothideomycetes genera
Lichen genera
Taxa described in 1915